Pionýr may refer to: 

Pionýr (Socialist Czechoslovakia), a youth Marxist–Leninist organization in communist Czechoslovakia
Pionýr (Czech Republic), a Czech-based voluntary, youth organization partially based on the Pioneer movement

See also 
 Pioneer movement
 Pioneer (disambiguation)